Ugia duplicata is a species of moth in the family Erebidae. It was described by Max Gaede in 1940, without mentioning the collecting locality.

References

Moths described in 1940
Ugia